Martina Hingis was the two-time defending champion, but retired in the semifinals against Lindsay Davenport.

Davenport won the title, defeating Justine Henin in the final 7–5, 6–4.

Seeds
The first four seeds received a bye into the second round.

Draw

Finals

Top half

Bottom half

Qualifying

Seeds

Qualifiers

Lucky losers

Draw

First qualifier

Second qualifier

Third qualifier

Fourth qualifier

External links
Draw information

Porsche Tennis Grand Prix Singles
2001 Women's Singles